Umfray is a surname. Notable people with the surname include:

Andrew Umfray, 14th-century bishop
John Umfray (died 1409 or after), English politician and draper